Grave Creek may refer to:

Grave Creek (Oregon)
Grave Creek (West Virginia)